The Poland national under-17 football team represents Poland in international football at this age level and is controlled by Polish Football Association.

This team is for Polish players aged 17 or under at the start of a two-year European Under-17 Football Championship campaign.

Competitive record
*Denotes draws include knockout matches decided on penalty kicks.
Gold background colour indicates that the tournament was won.
Silver background colour indicates second place finish.
Bronze background colour indicates third place finish.
Red border color indicates tournament was held on home soil.

UEFA European U-17 Championship

FIFA U-17 World Cup

Results and fixtures

Players

Current squad
The following players were selected for friendly games against Norway, Belgium and Sweden on 5, 7 and 9 February 2023.
Caps and goals updated as of 26 October 2022 after the match against .

Recent call-ups
The following players (born in 2006 or later) have previously been called up to the Poland under-17 squad in the last 12 months and are still eligible to represent:

See also
 Poland national football team
 Poland Olympic football team
 Poland national under-21 football team
 Poland national under-20 football team
 Poland national under-19 football team
 Poland national under-18 football team
 Poland national under-16 football team

References

External links
 UEFA Under-17 website

U
European national under-17 association football teams